Volvariella is a genus of mushrooms with deep salmon pink gills and spore prints.

Description
They lack a ring, and have an Amanita-like volva at the stem base.  Some species of Amanita look similar, but Amanita has white spores and often have a ring.  Since the gills of young Volvariella  are white at first, they are more easily mistaken for Amanita.  The genus is estimated to contain about 50 species.

Species
Many sources list Volvariella as a member of the Pluteaceae family, but recent DNA studies have revealed that Pluteus and Volvariella evolved separately and have very different DNA.  These studies show that Volvariella is very closely related to "schizophylloid" mushrooms like Schizophyllum commune.

Some species of Volvariella are popular edibles in Europe, accounting for 16% of total production of cultivated mushrooms in the world.

Cultivation and edibility
Volvariella volvacea, well known as the "paddy straw mushroom", is cultured in rice straw in the Philippines and Southeast Asia.  This species also favors wood chip piles. Unfortunately, it is easy to mistake the death cap mushroom (Amanita phalloides), as well as some other Amanita species, for this edible species due to similarities in appearance. This mistake is the leading cause of lethal mushroom poisoning in the United States. Volvariella and Amanita cannot be distinguished in the early "button stage", that, for many, is  considered the best stage to collect Volvariella for consumption. Like Amanita, the paddy straw mushroom has a volva, or universal veil, so called because it is a membrane that encapsulates the entire mushroom when it is young. This structure breaks apart as the mushroom expands, leaving parts that can be found at the base of the stalk as a cup-like structure.

List of species

References
 Key to the genus Volvariella 

Pluteaceae
Edible fungi
Agaricales genera
Taxa named by Carlo Luigi Spegazzini